Mladá fronta Dnes (Young Front Today), also known as MF DNES or simply Dnes (Today), is a daily newspaper in the Czech Republic. Its name could be translated into English as Youth Front Today. As of 2016, it is the second largest Czech newspaper, after the Czech tabloid Blesk.

History and profile

The paper was set up in 1945 under the name Mladá fronta as a daily newspaper for youth. During the era of socialism, Mladá fronta was the newspaper of the Socialist Union of Youth.

After the 1989 Velvet Revolution, its popularity grew and nowadays it is not connected to the Socialist Youth in any way, neither in terms of organisation nor policy.

The paper is owned by Mafra a.s., a subsidiary of the Agrofert group, a company owned by the Czech Prime Minister  (from 2018), Andrej Babiš. MAFRA a.s. was previously the Czech subsidiary of the German group Rheinisch-Bergische Druckerei- und Verlagsgesellschaft GmbH (the publisher of the Rheinische Post), that bought it from French press group Socpresse in 1994. MAFRA a.s. also owns the Czech daily newspaper Lidové noviny, the Czech edition of the freesheet Metro, the TV music channel Óčko.

The paper is published in Berliner format. It consists of four sections, one of which contains regional content. Its orientation can be described as right-wing conservative.

Circulation of Mladá fronta DNES
 2001: 338,000 copies 
 2002: 312,000 copies (the second best selling newspaper in the country) 
 2003: 316,206 copies (the second best selling newspaper in the country) 
 2006: 300,000 copies (the second best selling newspaper in the country) 
 2007: 287,864 copies (the third best selling newspaper in the country)
 2008: 291,711 copies
 2009: 256,118 copies 
 2010: 239,646 copies 
 2011: 222,377 copies 
 2013: The paper had the highest circulation in the country.

See also
 List of newspapers in the Czech Republic
 Concentration of media ownership in the Czech Republic

References

External links

 
 iDNES, the independent Internet portal of MF DNES

Czech-language newspapers
Newspapers published in Prague
Daily newspapers published in the Czech Republic
Newspapers established in 1945